The biconic cusp was one of the earliest suggestions for plasma confinement in a fusion reactor. It consists of two parallel electromagnets with the current running in opposite directions, creating oppositely directed magnetic fields. The two fields interact to form a "null area" between them where the fusion fuel can be trapped.

Most early work on the cusp design was carried out at the Courant Institute in New York by Harold Grad in the late 1950s and early 1960s. Variations on the basic concept include the picket fence reactor built at Los Alamos in the 1950s and ring reactors. All of these devices leaked their fuel plasma at rates much greater than predicted and most work on the concept ended by the mid-1960s. Mikhail Ioffe later demonstrated why these problems arose.

A later device that shares some design with the cusp is the polywell concept of the 1990s. This can be thought of as multiple cusps arranged in three dimensions.

Description 

The magnetic fields in this system were made by electromagnets placed close together.  This was a theoretical construct used to model how to contain plasma.  The fields were made by two coils of wire facing one another.  These electromagnets had poles which faced one another and in the center was a null point in the magnetic field.  This was also termed a zero point field.  These devices were explored theoretically by Dr. Harold Grad at NYU's Courant Institute in the late 1950s and early 1960s.  Because the fields were planar symmetric this plasma system was simple to model.

Particle behavior 

Simulations of these geometries revealed the existence of three classes of particles.  The first class moved back and forth far away from the null point.  These particles would be reflected close to the poles of the electromagnets and the plane cusp in the center.  This reflection was due to the magnetic mirror effect.  These are very stable particles, but their motion changes as they radiate energy over time.  This radiation loss arose from acceleration or deceleration by the field and can be calculated using the larmor formula. The second particle moved close to the null point in the center.  Because particles passed through locations with no magnetic field, their motions could be straight, with an infinite gyroradius.  This straight motion caused the particle to make a more erratic path through the fields.  The third class of particles was a transition between these types.  Biconic cusps were recently revived because of its similar geometry to the Polywell fusion reactor.

References

Further reading 

Biconic cusp simulation work

Magnetic devices
Plasma physics